The following is a timeline of the history of Barrow-in-Furness, England, United Kingdom.

Prior to 19th century
 1086 - The Doomesday Book records settlements in Hietun, Rosse and Hougenai (now Hawcoat, Roose and Walney)
 1123 - Furness Abbey is established
 1190 - Barrow Island from which Barrow takes its name is first recorded as being named Barrai
 1327 - The current Piel Castle is completed
 1537 - Furness Abbey is destroyed in the English Reformation

19th century

 1801 - Population of village of Barrow stood at 1,958 during 1801 UK Census
 1804 - Walney Lighthouse is completed
 1839 - Henry Schneider arrives to exploit local iron ore 
 1846 
 Furness Railway is opened
 Roa Island causeway is completed
 1847 - Population: 325.
 1850 - Expansive haematite deposits are discovered in the area 
 1852 - Jane Roper is the first ship to be built in Barrow 
 1858 - St. Mary of Furness Roman Catholic Church is built
 1859 - Schneider Hannay & Co is founded.
 1860 - Barrow Co-operative Society is established
 1861 - St. George's Church is built
 1863 - Construction begins on Barrow's dock system
 1865
 A magnitude 3.0 earthquake causes extensive damage to the Rampside area
 Schneider Hannay & Co becomes the Barrow Hematite Steel Company.
 1867 
 Barrow is granted municipal borough status
 Sir James Ramsden becomes first mayor of Barrow
 Devonshire Dock opens.
 Cases' Brewery opens
 1869 - St. James' Church is built
 1870 - Barrow Jute Works are completed
 1871
 The Barrow Shipbuilding Company is established
 Barrow Corn Mills are built
 1872 - Furness Golf Club is founded 
 1873 - Duke of Devonshire is the first steamship to be built in Barrow
 1875 
 Barrow Football Club, the forerunner of Barrow Raiders is established
 Devonshire Buildings are built
 1876 - Barrow's steelworks become the world's largest 
 1877 - St. James' Church installs a ring of 8 bells - first rung on St James' day (25th July)
 1879 - Ramsden Dock completed.
 1881
 The autonomous Barrow-in-Furness Borough Police force is established
 SS City of Rome is launched, briefly the world's largest liner
 1882 - Barrow Central railway station is opened
 1884 - Michaelson Road Bridge is opened
 1885 
 The Barrow and Furness parliament constituency is established
 Barrow-in-Furness Tramways Company commences operation.
 1886 - Ottoman submarine Abdül Hamid is launched in Barrow and becomes the first submarine to fire a live torpedo underwater
 1887
 Barrow Town Hall is opened by Spencer Cavendish, 8th Duke of Devonshire
 North Lonsdale Hospital is opened
 1888 - Town becomes a county borough.
 1889 - Co-operative Building built.
 1891 - Population: 51,712.
 1896 - Death of Sir James Ramsden mechanical engineer, industrialist, and first mayor of Barrow.
 1897 - The Barrow Shipbuilding Company becomes Vickers Shipbuilding and Engineering after being purchased by Vickers Limited
 1898 - The North-Western Daily Mail first begins publishing
 1899 - Barrow-in-Furness power station commissioned.

20th century

 
 1900 - Japanese battleship Mikasa is launched
 1901
 Population of Barrow stood at 67,354 during 1901 UK Census
 Barrow A.F.C. is established
 The Vickerstown estate is completed
 1902 - Abbey Road Synagogue is built
 1903 - The Barrow Technical School is established
 1904 - Hotel Majestic built.
 1908
 Jubilee Bridge is opened.
 Barrow Park created.
 1909
 Brazilian battleship São Paulo and HMS Vanguard are launched
 1911 - The Mayfly airship disaster
 1912 
 Barrow Central Fire Station is opened
 Japanese battleship Kongō is launched
 1914 
 The outbreak of World War I in which 616 Barrovian men die
 Abbey House is built
 Explosion occurs on Tanker SS Vedra which runs aground off Walney killing 36
 1919 - Barrow Park Cenotaph is built
 1922
 Barrow Main Public Library is opened
 Sporadic marches and violence occur over shipyard overtime disputes
 1929 - Buccleuch Street Electricity Plant opens
 1931 - RMS Strathaird is launched
 1932 - Barrow-in-Furness Tramways Company ceases operation 
 1938 - The John Whinnerah Institute is established
 1939 
 Outbreak of World War II in which 268 Barrovian men die 
 HMS Illustrious is launched
 1940 
 HMS Indomitable is launched by Winston Churchill
 HMS Upholder the most successful British submarine of the war is launched
 Luftwaffe aerial bombardment of Barrow during World War II begins
 1941
 Barrow/Walney Island Airport is opened as a Royal Air Force base
 The majority of the Barrow Blitz takes place killing 83 civilians 
 1943 - HMS Colossus is launched
 1944 - The role of Bishop of Barrow-in-Furness is placed in abeyance
 1945 
 HMAS Melbourne is launched
 RMS Empress of Russia is gutted by fire in Buccleuch Dock
 1947 - Barrow Hematite Steel Company Limited becomes Barrow Ironworks Limited
 1951 - Barrow's population peaks at 76,619 during the 1951 UK Census
 1953 - HMS Hermes the largest naval vessel built in Barrow is launched
 1954 - The coal-fired Roosecote Power Station opens
 1955 - First and to date only time Barrow have won rugby league's Challenge Cup
 1959 - SS Oriana is launched
 1960 - Queen Elizabeth II launches HMS Dreadnought the UK's first nuclear powered submarine
 1963 - Iron ore deposits run out and ironworks cease operation
 1965 - Queen Elizabeth II launches oil tanker British Admiral, the first UK vessel to exceed 100,000 tonnes
 1967 - Craven House built.
 1971 - HMS Swiftsure is launched
 1974 
 The Borough of Barrow-in-Furness is formed
 Barrow is annexed from Lancashire to become part of the modern county of Cumbria
 1977 - HMS Invincible is launched
 1980 - Barrow's last remaining steelworks close down
 1981 - HMS Trafalgar is launched
 1984 - Furness General Hospital is opened
 1985 - Rampside Gas Terminal first collects gas from the Irish Sea
 1986 - Devonshire Dock Hall is completed
 1990 - Barrow A.F.C. win the FA Trophy
 1992
 Commercial operations cease at Barrow/Walney Island Airport
 HMS Vanguard is launched
 Dalton bypass opens
 1994 - South Lakes Wild Animal Park opens
 1995 - GEC buys Barrow's shipyard
 1997 - Dock Museum opens
 1998
 Portland Walk Shopping Centre opens
 Queen Elizabeth II names HMS Ocean after being fitted out in Barrow
 1999 - GEC is merged with BAE Systems and the shipyard becomes part of BAE Systems Marine

21st century

 2000 - RFA Wave Knight is launched
 2001
 Population of Barrow stood at 71,979 during 2001 UK Census
 HMS Albion and HMS Bulwark are launched
 2002 - A major outbreak of legionellosis occurs
 2006 
 Local council becomes first public body charged with manslaughter
 Barrow Offshore Wind Farm is completed
 2007 - HMS Astute is launched
 2010 
 Construction of 'The Waterfront' begins
 Barrow A.F.C. win the FA Trophy
 2011 - Furness General Hospital scandal comes to light
 2014 - The 8 bells at St James' Church are restored after being unsafe to ring and silent for 15 years.
 2016 - UK Government approves construction of the Dreadnought-class submarines in Barrow

See also
 History of Cumbria
 Listed buildings in Barrow-in-Furness
 List of ships and submarines built in Barrow-in-Furness
 List of people from Barrow-in-Furness

References

Further reading 
 

Timeline
Barrow-in-Furness
Barrow-in-Furness